The International Society of Blood Transfusion (ISBT) is a scientific society founded in 1935, which promotes the study of blood transfusion and provides information about the ways in which blood transfusion medicine and science can best serve patients' interests. The society's central office is in Amsterdam, and there are around 1500 members in 103 countries. Currently, the President is Michael Busch.

ISBT is governed by a voluntary Board of 16 Directors, representing all WHO regions. ISBT has 16 scientific working parties; groups of ISBT members promoting science, research and best practice in their specific areas of expertise. 

ISBT advocates standardisation and harmonisation in the field of blood transfusion. The other major impact on the transfusion community is the classification of various human blood group systems under a common nomenclature. ISBT's coordination also extends to obtaining donors with rare antigens, a process that often involves international searches and a common terminology is critical to that process.

The ISBT “Code of Ethics”, was developed in response to the World Health Assembly resolution WHA 28.72.  This resolution called for the establishment of: appropriately governed national blood services; voluntary non-remunerated blood donation (VNRBD); and the promotion of the health of both blood donors and recipients of blood. ISBT works as a Non-state actor in official relations with WHO. ISBT collaborated with WHO to produce "Educational modules on clinical use of blood".

History
A history of ISBT was written by Dr. Hans Erik Heier in 2015. He distinguished four phases in the formation of the society.

The formation of the International Society of Blood Transfusion, or Societé International de Transfusion Sanguine, as it was called at the time, was initiated in Rome at a meeting between representatives from 20 nations, the International Red Cross and the Bogdanov institute in Moscow. Blood transfusion was a rather new therapeutic option, and therefore it was decided that transfusion-specific congresses should be organised, to highlight the potential importance of transfusion. To organize these congresses, a society was needed.

After it was decided that a society dedicated to organizing transfusion-related congresses should be created, it did not take long until ISBT was founded. In 1937 in Paris a Central Office (CO) was set up, led by newly appointed Secretary General Arnault Tzanck. Two years later, in 1939, the CO activities had to be suspended because of the Second World War (WW2).

In the period surrounding WW2 immunohaematology and transfusion technology developed rapidly. Blood banks were created, voluntary blood donations came in great numbers in the allied nations, plasma-transfusion became a standard anti-shock treatment, Rh and Kell systems were discovered, and industrial blood plasma fractionation was developed to produce albumin, which can be used as a substitute for plasma. In 1947 the first post-war congress was organised in Turin, Italy. Here some specific future goals were laid out to complement the main activity of the Society, the organization of congresses:
- Non-commercialisation of blood and derivatives.
- Oversee and initiate standardisation of equipment, reagents and nomenclature.
- Stimulate the set-up of central transfusion organisations for every country, under flag of the National Red Cross Society, unless otherwise organised.

After the congress in Turin and the goals that were set there, the society was able to continue its work for 40 years, until 1985, the year of crisis.

In 1985 the HIV/AIDS epidemic struck transfusion medicine. During that time the ISBT CO was still located in Paris as a part of the Centre National de Transfusion Sanguine (CNTS) as their head, Michel Garretta, was also ISBT Secretary General at the time. In June 1991 he stepped down as head of CNTS, as the HIV/AIDS crisis had become a catastrophe for the transfusion system in France and eventually led to a reorganisation of CNTS in 1991. Subsequently, at the ISBT Congress in Hong Kong it was decided that ISBT could no longer be linked to CNTS, ruling out Garretta's succession of a French colleague. Harold Gunson, who was President of ISBT in 1991, agreed to take on a second role as acting Secretary General. Together with CNTS, and ISBT Secretary Claudine Hossenlopp, he supervised the move of the CO from Paris to Manchester, UK. In 1994, he resigned from his post as blood centre director in Manchester and moved the ISBT CO to Lancaster, into his own home. He upheld the CO together with his wife until 1999. The end of Gunson's term meant having to find a new location for the CO, and a new Secretary General.

In 1999 the new location for the ISBT CO was Amsterdam, where it became a part of professional congress organiser (PCO) Eurocongress. Paul Strengers, a doctor at Sanquin Blood Supply, took up the role of Secretary General. A new vision for the 2002–2006 period of ISBT was created by the executive committee, focusing on developing ISBT into an umbrella organization, improving communication with the membership, educational and scientific activities, and professionalizing the central office. In the coming ten years, the society worked to achieve these goals, with Strengers to remain Secretary General for that period. Eurocongress organised ISBT congresses together with the CO and local organizing committees. The help of a PCO took away economic risks attached to congresses, as they were able to provide professional assistance and detailed advice. As the CO had moved to a different country, the ISBT statutes and by-laws were also updated and adapted to Dutch law.

The reformations made in the previous years had led to an increase in workload for the ISBT CO. In order to continue the fulfilment of the strategic plans of the ISBT, a full-time, paid Chief Executive Officer (CEO) was hired in 2010. In 2012 the CO moved to a separate location in Amsterdam as the shared space with Eurocongress did not meet the needs of the expanded CO staff. Currently, five paid persons are employed full-time at the CO, managed by CEO Judith Chapman (2010 – today). Congresses are organised by MCI, of which Eurocongress became a part in 2010. In that same year, Martin Olsson was appointed as Scientific Secretary (non-remunerated) to overlook the scientific programming of ISBT congresses and to guarantee the high scientific quality. The second scientific secretary, Ellen van der Schoot, is currently in office until 2018.

See also

 ISBT 128
 World Blood Donor Day

References

External links
 Vox Sanguinis

Blood banks
Transfusion medicine
Organizations established in 1935
Medical and health organisations based in the Netherlands